Francesco Mancini (born June 21, 1990 in Rome, Italy) is an Italian footballer who currently plays as a midfielder for Milazzo.

Having come through the youth system of Lazio, Mancini was sent on loan to Varese in 2009 without having played a senior game for his parent club. However, he failed to make a senior appearance at Varese also and the following season was sent to Lumezzane.

References 

Living people
1990 births
Italian footballers
S.S. Lazio players
F.C. Lumezzane V.G.Z. A.S.D. players
F.C. Grosseto S.S.D. players
Serie B players
Association football midfielders